John Kelly (1909 – ?) was an English professional footballer who played as an inside forward in the Football League for York City, and in non-League football for Durham City and Yorkshire Amateur.

References

1909 births
Year of death missing
English footballers
Association football forwards
Durham City A.F.C. players
York City F.C. players
Yorkshire Amateur A.F.C. players
English Football League players